For list of destinations managed by Nordic Regional Airlines on behalf of Finnair, see Nordic Regional Airlines destinations 

Finnair flies mainly within Europe, but also serves many destinations around the world with their A350 and A330 aircraft.

Europe and domestic 
Europe is Finnair's main market. Some domestic and European flights are partly operated on behalf of Finnair by Nordic Regional Airlines, using ATR and Embraer aircraft. Finnair operates flights to Europe using the Airbus A320 family. Some of Finnair's daily flights to London and Amsterdam are operated using an Airbus A350 XWB.

During the past few years, Finnair has launched several new routes to Europe and switched some from charter to scheduled flights. In the 2016 summer season, Finnair added four new scheduled routes in Europe, while 8 charter/leisure routes were converted to scheduled service. Those routes are from Helsinki to Billund, Edinburgh, Mytilene, Preveza, Pula, Rimini, Santorini, Skiathos, Varna, Verona, and Zakinthos. In the summer season of 2017, Finnair began flying to several new destinations including Alicante, Corfu, Ibiza, Menorca, and Reykjavík (Keflavík). In 2017, Finnair saw the fastest growth in the airline's history by adding capacity to numerous destinations in Europe as well as in Asia and Latin America. In 2018, Finnair resumed flights to Lisbon and Stuttgart. The growth continued in the winter of 2018 as the airline added up to 100 weekly flights, mostly within Europe. For example, Finnair began a new service to Lyon and made Edinburgh and Alanya (Gazipaza) year-round destinations.

Asia 
Asia is also an important market for Finnair. The airline serves around 20 destinations in Asia from its hub at Helsinki Airport, with around 100 weekly frequencies in the summer of 2018. Currently, most of the Asian routes are operated by Airbus A350 aircraft, and some flights with the Airbus A330-300.

Finnair began service to Asia in 1976 with the carrier's first non-stop route to Bangkok. Seven years later, in 1983, the carrier opened its first non-stop route to Eastern Asia, to Tokyo, Japan. In June 1988 the airline started service to Beijing, its first destination in China. This made it the first western European airline to fly to that city.

China has become one of Finnair's main markets, along with Japan. Following the route to Beijing, the airline opened up four more destinations in China: Shanghai in 2003, Guangzhou in 2005 (ended in 2008 and resumed in 2016), Chongqing in 2012, and Xi'an in 2013. In addition, Finnair began a new service to Nanjing on 13 May 2018 increasing the number of destinations in Greater China to seven, including Hong Kong, that is served with 10-12 weekly flights. Measured by passenger numbers, Japan is the largest market in Asia for Finnair, where the airline has four destinations. The number of destinations in Japan is the highest among the European airlines. These are Fukuoka which commenced in 2016, Nagoya, Osaka (a new route to Osaka opened up in 1995 and was the 5th intercontinental destination) and Tokyo. In the summer of 2018, the airline planned up to 35 weekly flights to Japan as well as to China. Seoul, South Korea is also among the growing destinations by passengers carried.

Finnair flies to several destinations in southeastern Asia. India has been in the airline's network from 2007, when service to Delhi started. Flights to Mumbai started in 2008 but were canceled the same year due to the global financial crisis. The airline also planned services to Bangalore and Chennai. In addition, Finnair had a charter service to Goa but is now operated as a scheduled service. The route was previously operated via Dubai. In the region, Finnair has also served Colombo. Thailand is served by three Finnair services to Bangkok, Krabi, and Phuket, all of which are served by the A350. In Vietnam there is a service to Ho Chi Minh City and previously, to Hanoi. Finnair also has a daily service to Singapore.

On 20 June 2017, Finnair started its first route to Central Asia: Nur-Sultan. The service is operated twice a week in the summer season.

In March 2013, Finnair announced that it was considering the following 13 potential new Asian destinations: Bangalore, Busan, Changsha, Chennai, Hangzhou, Jakarta, Kuala Lumpur, Kunming, Manila, Mumbai, Sapporo, Tianjin, and Ulaanbaatar. Fukuoka was also included, but the airline already commenced flights in May 2016. In 2006 Finnair planned to launch a service to Kuala Lumpur which was planned via Bangkok. However, Finnair canceled the plan and switched the Helsinki–Singapore route to non-stop. Previously, it was operated via Bangkok.

In the future, Finnair is looking to expand its service to China even further by adding new destinations and increasing frequencies on main routes such as Beijing and Shanghai. However, existing bilateral agreements between Finland and China disallow more than seven weekly flights to the aforementioned cities. The airline is also considering adding new destinations and airports to its network in Japan, with Sapporo and Tokyo Haneda as targets. In addition, Finnair plans to expand in South Korea with a new possible service to Busan and by adding flights to Seoul. Malaysia and Indonesia have been mentioned as potential new markets as well.

The Middle East 
In the Middle East Finnair has several destinations, including Dubai in the United Arab Emirates and Tel Aviv and Eilat in Israel. As of winter 2018, Finnair planned to operate seven weekly flights to Dubai six days a week with both Airbus A321 narrow-body aircraft and Airbus A350 wide-body aircraft. Tel Aviv was served three to five times a week during the summer of 2018, and Eilat once a week in the winter season. In the past, Finnair has also served Bahrain and Jordan.

Americas 
Finnair has served North America since 1969: its first intercontinental route started on 15 May 1969 to New York City via Copenhagen and Amsterdam.  Besides New York, Finnair flies to Chicago, San Francisco, Los Angeles, Miami, Dallas, and Seattle in the United States. Previously the airline also flew to Boston and Detroit. In Canada the carrier previously operated flights to Halifax, Montréal and Toronto. Halifax was used as a stopover on the carrier's Caribbean flights.

On 25 September 2015, Finnair announced that the airline would make Miami route a year-round one, and add more frequencies to Chicago due to an increase in demand. While Finnair made Miami a year-round route, the airline discontinued its Toronto service. Now Finnair has seven scheduled routes to North America: Miami with three weekly frequencies in the winter season, New York with daily service and Chicago, a summer seasonal route with daily service from 2018, a thrice-weekly San Francisco service, and once-weekly service to Puerto Vallarta. Flights to Dallas-Fort Worth and Seattle were reintroduced for 2022.

From December 2017, Finnair flew to several destinations in the Caribbean including Havana and Puerto Plata, and to the Pacific coast such as Puerto Vallarta. Those destinations were previously served by charter flights, but all of them were switched to scheduled service. These routes are Finnair's first scheduled routes to Latin America. Puerto Vallarta is Finnair's first destination in North America that is regularly served with the Airbus A350, and the longest route. In Latin America, Finnair has flown to cities such as Recife, Fortaleza, Panama, Holguin, Varadero, Cartagena, and Margarita.

In addition to the scheduled destinations listed here, Finnair operates charter flights to a variety of destinations.

City statistics

Finnair's top 5 airports in 2016. (Ranked by monthly seat capacity)

List

References

External links
 Finnair website
 The History of Finnair

Lists of airline destinations
Oneworld destinations
D

fi:Finnair#Kohteet